Findlater is a surname. Notable people with the surname include:

George Findlater (1872–1942), Scottish soldier
John Findlater (1926–2013), Scottish meteorologist
Leah Findlater, Canadian and American computer scientist
Richard Findlater, British journalist and author
Rick Findlater, makeup artist, known for The Hobbit films